The High Sheriff of Limerick was the British Crown's judicial representative in County Limerick, Ireland from the 13th century until 1922, when the office was abolished in the new Free State and replaced by the office of Limerick County Sheriff. The sheriff had judicial, electoral, ceremonial and administrative functions and executed High Court Writs. In 1908, an Order in Council made the Lord-Lieutenant the Sovereign's prime representative in a county and reduced the High Sheriff's precedence. However, the sheriff retained his responsibilities for the preservation of law and order in the county. The usual procedure for appointing the sheriff from 1660 onwards was that three persons were nominated at the beginning of each year from the county and the Lord Lieutenant then appointed his choice as High Sheriff for the remainder of the year. Often the other nominees were appointed as under-sheriffs. Sometimes a sheriff did not fulfil his entire term through death or other event and another sheriff was then appointed for the remainder of the year. The dates given hereunder are the dates of appointment. All addresses are in County Limerick unless stated otherwise.

High Sheriffs of County Limerick
1274: Sir  Robert  Bagod  the  elder
1302-3: Sir  Robert  Bagod the younger 
1371: William Cadygan
1372: James de la Hyde
1375-1376: Sir Thomas Clifford, Kt
1403: Thomas Fitzmaurice
1424–1425: Sir Thomas Fitzthomas
1453: Sir Thomas Fitzthomas Fitzgerot Fitzmaurice Fitzgerald
1545: Teige M'Brene
1558: Gerald Fitzgerald of Thomastown

17th century

18th century

19th century

20th century
 1900: Basil James Roche-Kelly of Rockstown Castle.
 1901: William Jasper Joseph White of Mount Sion.
 1903: Clennell Frank Massy Drew.
 1904: Desmond FitzJohn Lloyd FitzGerald, 27th Knight of Glin.
 1905: Hugh Hamon Massy O'Grady.
 1906: Erasmus Joseph Beresford Gubbins of Kilrush, Knocklong.
 1907:
 1908: John Joseph Ryan of Scarteen, Knocklong.
 1909:
 1910
 1911: James Denis Lyons of Croom House, Croom.
 1912: John Beatty Barrington.
 1913: Montiford Westropp Gavin.
 1914: John de Courcy O'Grady.
 1915: David Roche Browning.
 1916: Dermod O'Brien.

References

Limerick
History of County Limerick